Children of the Corn V: Fields of Terror is a 1998 American supernatural slasher horror film, written and directed by Ethan Wiley and starring Stacy Galina, Alexis Arquette, Adam Wylie, Eva Mendes, and Ahmet Zappa. It is the fifth installment of the Children of the Corn series. The leader of the cult in this installment, Ezeekial, is possessed by the enigmatic demon, "He Who Walks Behind the Rows".

The film is notable for featuring Stacy Galina in her first (and last) leading role in a film, and for being the feature film debut of Eva Mendes.

The film was followed by an unrelated sequel, titled Children of the Corn 666: Isaac's Return (1999).

Plot
A group of teenagers become lost in middle America and arrive in Divinity Falls, where forgotten children have taken on the duty of serving "He Who Walks Behind the Rows". The teenagers have less than a week to get out of the town. However, they find that their car is destroyed, and the children are held accountable. Allison, the leader of the teenagers, overhears that the children are the adopted wards of Luke Enright, a madman who considers himself the savior of the children, and the earthly representative of He Who Walks Behind The Rows. Upon remembering that her brother is also among them, Allison and the rest decide to go to Enright's farm to discover the truth behind the bizarre cult.

Upon arrival, they are stopped by Ezeekial, who could be considered the leader of the children, and he informs them they are on private property and must leave. After a debate, Allison is finally allowed to see Luke. He informs her that her brother is there, and agrees to let her see him, only to be rejected by him for leaving him alone with their abusive father. Jacob informs her that he is engaged to be married to a girl named Lily, and also states that she is pregnant with his child. Meanwhile, the rest of Allison's group are kept outside, where the men are intimidated by a physically-powerful and exceptionally-tall teen named Jared.

Ezeekial holds a ceremony for the annual sacrifice to He Who Walks Behind the Rows, which involves a child who has reached 18 years of age (lowered from 19 after Malachi was killed in the first film) to leap into a flaming corn silo where the god is supposed to dwell. Jacob is chosen, but he refuses and tells Ezekiel that his religion is false, angering him. Kir, one of the "outsiders", agrees to become a part of the cult after reading a part of their "Bible" earlier. After Jacob attempts to leave, Kir chooses to take the fateful course, and climbs to the silo and leaps to a fiery demise. The rest of the group wishes to leave the town, but Allison refuses to leave without Jacob. They leave her, and she eventually reads a message Jacob left her in his Bible. It translates to "Help", and she realizes he wants to escape. She enlists the help of the sheriff to stop Luke and Ezeekial.

Greg, who has developed a crush on Allison, chooses to go back and help her and the rest decide to go as well. Allison, with the aid of the sheriff and the fire department, attempt to stop the silo and arrest Luke. While trying to extinguish the silo, the flames come alive and kill the two fire fighters and Luke kills the sheriff and apparently himself after his head splits open and a burst of flame shoots through. Ezeekial reveals that Luke had been dead for years, and he is the children's true leader. After killing two of the deranged kids, Allison meets her friends, and an all-out battle erupts between them and the kids ending with the deaths of everyone except Allison. Allison eventually finds her brother (captured by Ezeekial for disobeying him), and before dying he tells her how to stop the corn god. Ezeekial tries to kill Allison, but after a struggle she sends him falling into the silo to a violent, fiery death. She then dumps fertilizer into the silo, killing the corn god in multiple explosions.

Allison then goes to Lily's house (Jacob's wife). Lily's parents tell Allison that Lily isn't ready to raise a baby because she is a baby herself. Lily tells Allison that it's for the best that she adopts her baby. As the film ends, the baby is seen being comforted by song, as the green-orange light of the silo fire is shown burning in his eyes.

Cast
Stacy Galina as Allison
Alexis Arquette as Greg
Eva Mendes as Kir
Adam Wylie as Ezeekial
Greg Vaughan as Tyrus
Angela Jones as Charlotte 
Ahmet Zappa as Lazlo
David Carradine as Luke Enright 
Olivia Burnette as Lily
Matthew Tait as Jared
Fred Williamson as Sheriff Skaggs
Dave Buzzotta as Jacob
Kane Hodder as Bartender

Release

Home media
The film, like its last two predecessors, did not receive a theatrical release but instead went straight-to-video on October 9, 2001 in VHS and DVD formats.

The film debuted on the Blu-ray format for the first time on May 15, 2011 via Echo Bridge Entertainment. It was included in a double feature with its sequel Children of the Corn 666: Isaac's Return (1999), also making its Blu-ray debut.

See also
 Children of the Corn (film series)
 List of adaptations of works by Stephen King

References

External links
 
 

1998 direct-to-video films
1998 horror films
Children of Corn 5
American slasher films
Children of the Corn
Miramax films
Dimension Films films
Direct-to-video horror films
Direct-to-video sequel films
1990s English-language films
Films about cults
Films about religion
Films directed by Ethan Wiley
Films set in Nebraska
1998 films
Films with screenplays by Ethan Wiley
1990s American films